Podanur or Pothanoor or Pothanur is a neighbourhood in the city of Coimbatore in Tamil Nadu, India. Its history goes back to the creation of a major railway station and colony during British rule. The station was a major hub and is functional since 1862, after Royapuram Railway station.

Podanur Junction

Podanur railway junction is one of the oldest in South India (earlier than Chennai Central). It was established in the year 1862.

Post office

Podanur Post office in the Coimbatore area. It was established in the year 1886.

Gandhi visit

Mahatama Gandhi visited Podanur Junction on March 19, 1925.

Notable residents 
Adam Sinclair, who represented the Indian field hockey team, resides in Podanur.

See also 
 Podanur Junction
 Railway stations in India

References 

Neighbourhoods in Coimbatore